Pijpers or Pijper is a Dutch occupational surname. A pijper was the general name for a woodwind player. People with this surname include:

Arno Pijpers (born 1959), Dutch football coach
Harmke Pijpers (born 1946), Dutch journalist, presenter and voiceover
Koen Pijpers (born 1969), Dutch field hockey player
René Pijpers (1917–1944), Dutch footballer
Pijper
 (1859–1926), Dutch theologian and historian
Theo Pijper (born 1980), Dutch motorcycle speedway rider
Willem Pijper (1894–1947), Dutch composer, music critic and music teacher

See also
Pipers (disambiguation)
Pyper, surname

References

Dutch-language surnames